Nendo may refer to:

 Nendo Island, part of the Solomon Islands
 Nendo (design firm), design firm founded by Sato Oki